Keriya may refer to the following locations:

China
Keriya County, county in Xinjiang, China
Keriya Town, town in Keriya County
Keriya River, river in Xinjiang
Israel
HaKirya, neighborhood and military base in Tel Aviv, Israel